Rajesh Mapuskar is an Indian film writer, director and producer. He got involved in the world of films at a very young age, as his family owned a cinema hall. He made his writing and directional debut with Ferrari Ki Sawaari (2012). Later, he wrote and directed the acclaimed Marathi language film Ventilator (2016), which won him several accolades, including the National Film Award for Best Director.

Early life and education
Rajesh Mapuskar was born on 26 September 1968 in Shrivardhan, a village in coastal Maharashtra. He was born into a joint family, to Anant Mahadev Mapuskar and Sindhu Anant Mapuskar. He studied at Shrivardhan High School till Grade 10 and then came to Mumbai and joined Kirti College, Dadar. He graduated with a Bachelor of Commerce degree.

He spent his childhood watching movies in the cinema hall his family owned. He got involved with taking care of it at a very young age - cleaning up, taking bookings and starting the film.

He also introduced his cousin Rohan Mapuskar to the film industry.

He has two sons Utsav and Zeal.

Film career 
Early career

Mapuskar was introduced to the media world in Mumbai by Dr. Satish Rajmachikar, a television producer-director.  In 1991, he started working in production with veteran ad film maker Dilip Ghosh at Z Films. He worked there for 4 years, then left to start on his own, producing and line-producing ad films in India and abroad. It was at this time that he met and formed a friendship with Rajkumar Hirani.

Mapuskar started Collective Efforts Films, which soon became a top line producing company. His friend Bimal Oberoi joined him as partner in the company. Mapuskar started directing music videos for artistes like Sonu Nigam, Jagjit Singh and Mika. Collective Effort Films also handled photographer Prasad Naik's print campaigns and multiple ad films in India and abroad.

Feature Films

Just when Mapuskar was readying to relocate from Mumbai to Bangkok because of the constant stream of work from there, Rajkumar Hirani asked him to work as Chief Assistant Director on his directorial debut, Munnabhai MBBS. After Munnabhai MBBS, Mapuskar worked on Hirani's next two films Lage Raho Munnabhai and 3 Idiots, as Associate Director. All three films were produced by Vinod Chopra Films.

Under the same banner, Rajesh Mapuskar made his writing and directorial debut with Ferrari Ki Sawaari. The critically acclaimed ‘father-son-father’ film, starring Sharman Joshi and Boman Irani, was released on 15 June 2012.

Mapuskar's next film was Marathi language film Ventilator. Written and directed by him, the film was produced by Priyanka Chopra and Dr. Madhu Chopra, under their banner Purple Pebble Pictures. The dark comedy on family relationships released on 4 November 2016. It featured Jitendra Joshi and director-actor Ashutosh Gowariker, along with an ensemble cast of 116 actors, including Mapuskar's sons Utsav and Zeal. With Ventilator, Mapuskar also launched his own production house Magij Films.

He is currently working on his next Hindi film, a musical based in North East India. The film goes on the floor mid-2017.

Ad Films

Mapuskar has directed numerous ad films in India and abroad for production houses like Fingerprint Films and Rajkumar Hirani Films. He has worked with brands like Cadbury Drinking Chocolate, Vodacom, Milo, Cello Butterflow, Airtel, Serengeti Beer, Classmate Pens and Pan Emirates.

Filmography

Actor
Sau Jhooth Ek Sach (2005)

Accolades

Notes

References

External links 
 
 INTERVIEW Rajesh Mapuskar, "People tried to discourage me from making ‘Ventilator’ in Marathi", says director Rajesh Mapuskar, 3 November 2016 · 01:30 pm
Biography,Rajesh Mapuskar is a director and writer, known for Ferrari Ki Sawaari (2012), Ventilator (2016) and 3 Idiots (2009)
Rajesh Mapuskar on MUBI,2012

Living people
Film directors from Mumbai
Hindi-language film directors
Marathi people
1968 births
Best Director National Film Award winners
21st-century Indian film directors
Filmfare Marathi Awards winners